Moshe Yosef may refer to:

 Moshe Yosef (footballer), Israeli footballer
 Moshe Yosef (rabbi)